The Palmer Method of penmanship instruction was developed and promoted by Austin Palmer in the late 19th and early 20th centuries. It was largely created as a simplified style of the "Spencerian Method", which had been the major standardized system of handwriting since the 1840s. The Palmer Method soon became the most popular handwriting system in the United States.

Under the method, students were taught to adopt a uniform system of cursive writing with rhythmic motions.

History

The method developed around 1888 and was introduced in the book Palmer's Guide to Business Writing (1894). Palmer's method involved "muscle motion" in which the more proximal muscles of the arm were used for movement, rather than allowing the fingers to move in writing. In spite of opposition from the major publishers, this textbook enjoyed great success: in 1912, one million copies were sold throughout the United States. The method won awards, including the Gold Medal at the Panama Pacific Exposition in San Francisco, in 1915, and the Gold Medal at the Sesquicentennial Exposition in Philadelphia, in 1926.

Proponents of the Palmer Method emphasized its plainness and speed, that it was much faster than the laborious Spencerian Method, and that it allowed the writer to compete effectively with the typewriter. To educators, the method's advocates emphasized regimentation, and that the method would thus be useful in schools to increase discipline and character, and could even reform delinquents.

The Palmer Method began to fall out of popularity in the 1950s and was eventually supplanted by the Zaner-Bloser Method, which sought to teach children print writing (also called "manuscript printing") before teaching them cursive, in order to provide them with a means of written expression as soon as possible, and thus develop writing skills. The D'Nealian Method, introduced in 1978, sought to address problems raised by the Zaner-Bloser Method, returning to a more cursive style of  print writing. The Palmer company stopped publishing in the 1980s.

Legacy
In radar engineering, a Palmer Scan is a scanning technique that produces a scanning beam by moving the main antenna and its feed in a circular motion. The name was derived from the looping circles practiced by students of the Palmer Method.

References

Bibliography

Further reading

 "The object of this website is to teach rapid, easily-executed, business writing. It has not been written to exploit any one’s skill as a pen artist. It aims to be of use to those who are ambitious to become good, practical business writers. The lessons it contains are not experimental, but have been the means of guiding millions of boys and girls, young men and women to a good business style of writing."

See also
 D'Nealian, a style of writing and teaching cursive and manuscript adapted from the Palmer Method
 Zaner-Bloser script, another streamlined form of Spencerian script
 Round hand, a style of handwriting and calligraphy originating in England in the 1660s
 Regional handwriting variation
 Teaching script
 Engraving

External links 
 
 
 
 
 

Penmanship
1894 introductions
Latin-script calligraphy
Western calligraphy